The Missouri Valley Conference Men's Basketball Coach of the Year is an annual basketball award given to the Missouri Valley Conference's most outstanding head coach. The award was first given following the 1948–49 season.

As of 2022, among current members, Drake has the most all–time awards with nine, and Bradley has the most individual recipients with six.  There have been three ties for the coach of the year (1969, 1973 and 1987); there have been fourteen repeat winners in the award's history. Two coaches have won the award three consecutive times—Maury John of Drake in 1968–1970 and Gregg Marshall of Wichita State in 2012–2014. The only current MVC members without a winner are Valparaiso, which played its first conference season in 2017–18, and the three programs that start MVC play in 2022–23—Belmont, Murray State, and UIC.

Key

Winners

Winners by current member schools
Years of joining for each school are the actual calendar years of entry, which normally occurs on July 1 of the stated calendar year. Years of awards reflect the end of the basketball season.

Footnotes

Winners from former members

Footnotes

References
 

NCAA Division I men's basketball conference coaches of the year
Coach of the Year
Awards established in 1949